Alfonso de Gortari (11 January 1904 – 16 March 1983) was a Mexican long jumper who competed in the 1928 Summer Olympics. He was born in Morelia, Michoacán.

References

1904 births
1983 deaths
Mexican male long jumpers
Sportspeople from Morelia
Olympic athletes of Mexico
Athletes (track and field) at the 1928 Summer Olympics
Central American and Caribbean Games gold medalists for Mexico
Competitors at the 1926 Central American and Caribbean Games
Central American and Caribbean Games medalists in athletics
20th-century Mexican people